Now Khaleh-ye Jafari (also Romanized as Now Khāleh-ye Ja‘farī and Nowkhāleh-ye Ja‘farī; also known as Kūhrūd, Nau-Khale, Now Khāleh, Now Khāleh Ja‘far, and Now Khaleh-ye Ja‘far) is a village in Hend Khaleh Rural District, Tulem District, Sowme'eh Sara County, Gilan Province, Iran. At the 2006 census, its population was 2,352, in 661 families.

References 

Populated places in Sowme'eh Sara County